or azekura is a Japanese architectural style of simple wooden construction, used for storehouses (kura), granaries, and other utilitarian structures.  This style probably dates to the early centuries of the Common Era, such as during the Yayoi or Kofun periods. It is characterized by joined-log structures of triangular cross-section, and commonly built of cypress timbers.

See also 
 Log building
 Shōsōin
 Japanese carpentry

References

Japanese architectural history
Log buildings and structures
Wooden buildings and structures in Japan